Frank LoPorto (born 7 February 1978) is an Australian former professional boxer who once held the PABA Super Welterweight Champion. He also challenged once for the WBA (Regular) light middleweight title in 2011.

Professional record

References

External links 
 
 - PABA Profile

1978 births
Living people
Light-middleweight boxers
Australian male boxers
Boxers from Melbourne
People from Brunswick, Victoria
Sportsmen from Victoria (Australia)